The Bucket of Blood is a public house in Phillack, Hayle, Cornwall, owned by St Austell Brewery and currently tenanted by Pete Hamiton and Nicola Reynolds. It is thought to be named after an incident where the landlord brought up a bucket of blood from the building's well. The resulting investigation revealed the corpse of a murdered Customs Officer which had been dropped there and the name has been recognised as one of the quirkiest in the country. The earliest parts of the building date from the late 13th century or early 14th century, as it was originally built to accommodate the construction of the neighbouring Phillack church, which was completed in the early 14th C. The pub was built from rubble with a slate roof. It was designated Grade II listed status on 14 January 1988.

Building
The earliest parts of the building date from the late 13th century or early 14th century. there are written records of the pub from the 1700's, but the building is known to much older than that. It was built using rubble with a slate roof. At each end of the building there is a brick chimney. The building has a 19th-century extension on one side to make an L shaped plan. The interior was remodelled during the 20th century. The public house was designated Grade II listed status on 14 January 1988.

Name
According to local folklore, the Bucket of Blood got its name many years ago when the landlord went to the on-site well to get a bucket of water but found there to be just blood. Further investigation investigation revealed the corpse of a murdered Customs Officer which had been dropped there. An alternative theory is that the well on the grounds would provide red water due to run off from local tin mining The name was recognised as one of the quirkiest in the country in 2011.

Current status
The building is owned by St Austell Brewery's and the current landlord and landlady, Pete Hamilton and Nicloa Reynolds, took over the tenancy and business in March 2022. In previous years Rick Shackelton ran the public house from when his father died in 1965.

References and footnotes 

Grade II listed pubs in Cornwall